Pablo McCandless Elton (born March 2, 1982 in Washington, D.C.) is an American-born Chilean slalom canoer who competed in the 2000s. He was eliminated in the qualifying round of the K-1 event at the 2008 Summer Olympics in Beijing, finishing in 16th place.

References
 Sports-Reference.com profile

1982 births
American emigrants to Chile
Canoeists at the 2008 Summer Olympics
Chilean male canoeists
Living people
Olympic canoeists of Chile
Sportspeople from Washington, D.C.